Novarese, locally pronounced Nuares, is a dialect of the Western Lombard language spoken in the province of Novara (Piedmont).

The dialect is rarely used in the city, where the use of Italian language is preferred, largely because of high immigration from Mezzogiorno; Novarese is more often used in the surrounding rural areas. There are some elements of transition with the Piedmontese language, particularly on the eastern coasts of the Sesia river, creating several transition dialects.

References 

Western Lombard language